Henry Hodgson may refer to: 
Henry Hodgson (bishop) (1856–1921), Bishop of St Edmundsbury and Ipswich in the Church of England
Henry Hodgson (British Army officer) (1868–1930), British Army general 
Henry Oswald Hodgson (1886–1975), English organist and composer